The EDM4S or EDM4S SkyWiper (Electronic Drone Mitigation 4 - System), is a portable electronic warfare anti-drone device made by the Lithuanian company NT Service. It is designed to disrupt small and medium sized UAVs by jamming the UAV's communication and satellite navigation systems with an electromagnetic pulse.

History  
The device was first shown by the company NT Service (from Kaunas, Lithuania) in the 2019 Security and Counter Terror Exhibition in London.

Capabilities 
The device can be carried by one person. Depending on the UAV's level of autonomy, it may then fall out of the sky, make a controlled landing, return to an earlier waypoint, or continue operating normally.

The device can have 4 or 6 antennas. By default there are two antennas for the 2.4 GHz and 5.8 GHz frequency bands, with a power of 10 W each, one antenna for the GPS 1.5 GHz band with a power of 10 W, and one antenna for the GLONASS 1.5 GHz band with a power of 10 W.

Device 
The device is made of aluminium, and is shaped like a rifle – including a trigger to activate the device and optics for sighting. It weighs 5.5kg and measures 1050 × 220 × 360 mm with the stock extended (830 × 220 × 360 mm without the stock extended). It is powered by a 24 V battery, which can last for up to 35 minutes.

Usage 
The EDM4S-UA version of the device – at a unit cost of $15,000 – was first used by the Ukrainian Armed Forces against Russian separatist drones in Donbas in 2021 as part of the Russo-Ukrainian War. It has since seen further use in the Russian invasion of Ukraine, shooting down Russian drones such as the Eleron. In June 2022, Lithuania donated 110 units to Ukraine at a cost of €1.5 million ($1.56 million).

References 

Electronic warfare equipment